In mathematics, a group  is said to be complete if every automorphism of  is inner, and it is centerless; that is, it has a trivial outer automorphism group and trivial center.

Equivalently, a group is complete if the conjugation map,  (sending an element  to conjugation by ), is an isomorphism: injectivity implies that only conjugation by the identity element is the identity automorphism, meaning the group is centerless, while surjectivity implies it has no outer automorphisms.

Examples 
As an example, all the symmetric groups, are complete except when }. For the case , the group has a non-trivial center, while for the case , there is an outer automorphism.

Properties 
A complete group is always isomorphic to its automorphism group (via sending an element to conjugation by that element), although the converse need not hold: for example, the dihedral group of 8 elements is isomorphic to its automorphism group, but it is not complete.  For a discussion, see .

Extensions of complete groups 

Assume that a group  is a group extension given as a short exact sequence of groups
 

with kernel, and quotient, . If the kernel, is a complete group then the extension splits:  is isomorphic to the direct product, .

This can be restated in terms of elements and internal conditions: If  is a normal, complete subgroup of a group , then  is a direct product. The proof follows directly from the definition:  is centerless giving  is trivial.

References 
 
  (chapter 7, in particular theorems 7.15 and 7.17).

External links 
 Joel David Hamkins: How tall is the automorphism tower of a group?

Properties of groups